Caesar was a Dutch indie rock trio from Amsterdam, consisting of Roald van Oosten, Marit de Loos and Sem Bakker. The band was founded in 1994. Caesar released four studio albums, plus one retrospective release in 2006, Before My Band Explodes. 
The band was stopped in 2008.  They were named for Julius Caesar who is famous for being a Roman Dictator.

History

Early days
In 1994 Roald van Oosten and Marit de Loos thought of starting a band together. Later that year Van Oosten met Sem Bakker. They discussed the idea that De Loos and Van Oosten have and Bakker agreed to join on bass. The fact that Bakker didn't play bass yet was seemingly not a problem. Thus Caesar’s line up was complete. After a mere month of playing together the trio released their first demo. 

The following year three more demos followed. The band was swiftly improving and Excelsior Recordings (then still known as (Nothing sucks like) Electrolux) noticed. It is for this label that the band recorded its first single Goodbye To Barruschna, it was released on vinyl in the fall of 1995.

Clean
Caesar’s debut album Clean, was released in May 1996. It was the first official album release of the Excelsior Recordings label. Upon its release in June, Clean was received enthusiastically by the press, even appearing in the Moordlijst, the chart of music magazine OOR. The positive response towards the album translates into a slot at the Lowlands festival in August. 

Caesar also played alongside Daryll-Ann on a tour in the Netherlands. The tour was a great success as audience turn-outs were consistently strong. The band also played other select dates with label mates Johan, Benjamin B and Scram C Baby.

No Rest For the Alonely
In 1998 the band played at Noorderslag, Pinkpop and Lowlands, three of the biggest Dutch festivals. The band was also judged as most promising new act of the year and received a Zilveren Harp, a prestigious Dutch award. In March the band’s second album No Rest for the Alonely was released in the Netherlands . It was a success and its first single Situations Complications receives a lot of airplay. Later that year the album was also released in the United Kingdom with a slightly different title, No Rest for the Lonely. Following this release the band toured the UK under the banner of British music magazine Melody Maker.

Leaving Sparks
Caesar played Noorderslag again in 1999 and received an Edison nomination for No Rest for the Alonely. For the Marlboro Flashback Tour the band played a set of Motown covers. In September Caesar flew to Chicago to work with infamous producer Steve Albini to record their third album, Leaving Sparks. In the meantime an acoustic version of Before My Head Explodes was included on the collection cd Twee Meter Sessie NL 1. The band also plays a set on the accompanying TV show. Leaving Sparks is released in March 2000.

Caesar
In early 2001, after a break of a six months, Caesar starts recording demo tracks for their upcoming self-titled album. In May the band plays as support act for US musician Stephen Malkmus. A year later the fictional rockumentary Shooting Stars is released. Two years earlier the band had participated in a 12-day shoot, playing a famous Dutch pop group. This pop group is the main focus of this feature film directed by Ronen Abas and Guy Mel. 

Marien Dorleijn leaves Caesar in December to focus more on his main band Nimbus. He does play on the band’s fourth album released in the following year. This self-titled album marks a return to the raucous and energetic sound of the band’s debut album. In March and October the band visits the US, respectively playing at South By South West and the CMJ Music Marathon in New York.

Side projects
Caesar plays some shows in France in March 2004. Van Oosten composes music for 'Zoenen of Schoppen' (‘Kissing or Kicking’), a movie directed by Janice Pierre. The picture premieres at the Dutch Film Festival in Utrecht in September. Marit de Loos joins Solex on drums during their October tour in the US.

During a self-proclaimed ‘sabbatical year’ the band actively pursues more side projects in 2005. Roald van Oosten starts Ghost Trucker with members of Alamo Race Track, Zoppo and Kopna Kopna. In January this band records a 3VOOR12-session at the Noorderslag festival. 

Van Oosten also writes and produces the music for the short film 'Brommermeisjes' by Janneke van Heesch. The film opens the Dutch Film Festival in October 2005. Van Oosten also produces music for 'Based on a True Story', a film by W. Stokman.

Before My Band Explodes
In November 2006 Caesar reconvenes for two try-out concerts for an oncoming tour in January and February. This tour coincides with the release of Before My Band Explodes. This retrospective album gives an overview of ten years of Caesar.

Discography
 Clean (1996)
 No Rest for the Alonely (1998)
 Leaving Sparks (2000)
 Caesar (2003)
 Before My Band Explodes (2006)

References

Dutch indie rock groups
Musical groups from Amsterdam